Detective Irene Daniels is a fictional character featured in TNT's television police drama series The Closer, portrayed by Gina Ravera. For seasons 1 through 4, Daniels is a Detective on the Los Angeles Police Department's Priority Homicide Department.

While her character is usually not in the foreground through an entire episode, Daniels is a very strong woman who can relate to the families of victims. She is extremely intelligent, hard-working, and has a sharp sense of humor. Her good looks get her more on-the-job attention than she sometimes wants. She never hesitates to put the detectives in their place when they attempt to flirt with her – except for Sgt. David Gabriel, with the two of them dating for a time. Even in that case, they avoid being flirtatious in public so as to avoid attention to their relationship from their superiors.

The friction caused by the breakup between Daniels and Gabriel grows stronger throughout season 4.  During the season finale "Double Blind," Lt. Provenza orders that either she or Gabriel apply to the Criminal Investigation division, to save the squad from their drama.  They both apply, though Chief Brenda Leigh Johnson is unaware of it. At the start of the 5th season, Daniels transfers to another division.

Fictional Los Angeles Police Department detectives
The Closer characters
Television characters introduced in 2005